Eric Thomas may refer to:
Eric Thomas (motivational speaker) (born 1970), American motivational speaker
Eric Thomas (cornerback) (born 1964), former American football player
Eric Thomas (wide receiver) (born 1991), arena football player
Eric Thomas (hurdler) (1973–2022), American track and field athlete
Eric Thomas (gynaecologist) (born 1953), Vice-Chancellor of the University of Bristol
Eric Thomas, inventor of LISTSERV
Eric Thomas (offensive lineman) in 2007 Austin Wranglers season
Eric Thomas (soccer), member of the Football Hall of Fame Western Australia
Erik Thomas (basketball) (born 1993), Argentinian basketball player

See also

 E. Thomas (disambiguation)
 Thomas (surname)